Hitchin was a parliamentary constituency in Hertfordshire which returned one Member of Parliament (MP)  to the House of Commons of the Parliament of the United Kingdom from 1885 until it was abolished for the 1983 general election.

Boundaries and boundary changes
1885–1918: The Sessional Divisions of Aldbury (except the parishes of Great Hadham and Little Hadham), Buntingford, Hitchin, Odsey, Stevenage, and Welwyn, and the parish of Braughing.

The constituency was established by the Redistribution of Seats Act 1885 (which followed on from the Third Reform Act) as one of four Divisions of the abolished three-member Parliamentary County of Hertfordshire, and was formally named as the Northern or Hitchin Division of Hertfordshire.  It included the towns/villages of Hitchin, Stevenage, Welwyn, Baldock and Royston.

1918–1945: The Urban Districts of Baldock, Hitchin, Royston, and Stevenage, the Rural Districts of Ashwell, Buntingford, Hitchin, and Welwyn, and in the Rural District of Hertford the parishes of Aston, Bennington, Datchworth, Sacombe, Walkern, and Watton-at-Stone.

Minor changes.

1945–1950: The Urban Districts of Baldock, Hitchin, Letchworth, Royston, and Stevenage, the Rural Districts of Hitchin, and Welwyn, and parts of the Rural Districts of Braughing and Hertford.

The constituency included a part of the Urban District of Welwyn Garden City, which had been formed as a separate local authority, and this was now transferred to St Albans.  Other nominal changes as a result of changes to local authority boundaries.

1950–1955: The Urban Districts of Baldock, Hitchin, Letchworth, Royston, and Stevenage, the Rural District of Hitchin, in the Rural District of Braughing the parishes of Anstey, Ardeley, Aspenden, Broadfield, Buckland, Buntingford, Cottered, Hormead, Meesden, Throcking, Westmilll, and Wyddiall, and in the Rural District of Hertford the parishes of Aston, Bennington, Datchworth, Sacombe, Walkern, and Watton-at-Stone.

The Rural District of Welwyn transferred to St Albans.

1955–1974: The Urban Districts of Baldock, Hitchin, Letchworth, Royston, and Stevenage, and the Rural District of Hitchin.

The part of the Rural District of Braughing transferred to the new County Constituency of East Hertfordshire and the part of the Rural District of Hertford transferred to Hertford.

1974–1983: The Urban Districts of Baldock, Hitchin, Letchworth, and Royston, and the Rural District of Hitchin.

The Urban District of Stevenage formed the majority of the new County Constituency of Hertford and Stevenage.

The constituency was abolished for the 1983 general election and was replaced by the new County Constituency of North Hertfordshire, with the exception of a small part in the south-east which was included in the new County Constituency of Stevenage (Codicote and Knebworth).

Members of Parliament

Notes:-
 a Dimsdale was a Baron of the Russian Empire.
 b Cecil associated himself with the non-coalition wing of the Conservative Party, at some point in the 1918-1922 Parliament.

Elections

Elections in the 1880s

Elections in the 1890s

Elections in the 1900s

Elections in the 1910s 

General Election 1914–15:

Another General Election was required to take place before the end of 1915. The political parties had been making preparations for an election to take place and by the July 1914, the following candidates had been selected; 
Unionist: Robert Cecil
Liberal:

Elections in the 1920s

Elections in the 1930s

Elections in the 1940s 
General Election 1939–40:
Another General Election was required to take place before the end of 1940. The political parties had been making preparations for an election to take place from 1939 and by the end of this year, the following candidates had been selected; 
 Conservative: Arnold Wilson
 Labour: George Lindgren

Elections in the 1950s

Elections in the 1960s

Elections in the 1970s

References

 

Parliamentary constituencies in Hertfordshire (historic)
Hitchin
Constituencies of the Parliament of the United Kingdom established in 1885
Constituencies of the Parliament of the United Kingdom disestablished in 1983